German submarine U-672 was a Type VIIC U-boat of Nazi Germany's Kriegsmarine during World War II. The submarine was laid down on 24 December 1941 at the Howaldtswerke yard at Hamburg, launched on 27 February 1943, and commissioned on 6 April 1943 under the command of Oberleutnant zur See Ulf Lawaetz.

Attached to 5th U-boat Flotilla based at Kiel, U-672 completed her training period on 30 September 1943 and was assigned to front-line service.

Design
German Type VIIC submarines were preceded by the shorter Type VIIB submarines. U-672 had a displacement of  when at the surface and  while submerged. She had two shafts and two  propellers.

U-672 was fitted with five  torpedo tubes (four fitted at the bow and one at the stern), fourteen torpedoes, one  SK C/35 naval gun, 220 rounds, and two twin  C/30 anti-aircraft guns. The boat had a complement of between forty-four and sixty.

Service history

Forced to surface, the crew abandoned ship and scuttled the U-boat. All 52 crew members survived and were picked up the next day by British life-boats.

References

Bibliography

External links

German Type VIIC submarines
1943 ships
Ships built in Hamburg
U-boats commissioned in 1943
U-boats scuttled in 1944
World War II shipwrecks in the English Channel
World War II submarines of Germany